Vernon L. Odom, Sr. (9 June 192122 May 1996) was an American civil rights leader. He was born in Biscoe, Arkansas to Dr. Elijah and Ada Odom.  His father was born into slavery in 1859 and later became a physician, his mother was a teacher and raised the children on her own after Elijah Odom's death in 1924. In 1949, Odom graduated from Morehouse College in Atlanta, Georgia. Thereafter he earned a master's degree in social work from Clark Atlanta University.

Odom was recognized for his 43 years of work for civil rights causes in Akron, Ohio, as well as his positions as the executive director of the Akron Community Service Center and the Akron chapter of the Urban League. Today, he is remembered by the Vern Odom Allotment, a suburban-style housing development located off Vernon Odom Boulevard.
Vernon Odom Boulevard, formerly Wooster Avenue (a main thoroughfare through one of Akron's predominantly African-American neighborhoods), was renamed in his honor in 2002. After this was passed, many local signs were renamed to read "V Odom Boulevard," reaping much public conversation and amusement.

From Bob Dyer's column "Dyer Streets" in the Akron Beacon Journal:

Odom was married to Sadie Harvey Odom. They had two children, Philadelphia journalist Vernon Odom and Maida C. Odom, who is a professor for journalism at Temple University, Philadelphia.

External links 
 Akron Beacon Journal Summary

1921 births
1996 deaths
Activists for African-American civil rights
People from Prairie County, Arkansas
Morehouse College alumni
Clark Atlanta University alumni
People from Akron, Ohio
Activists from Ohio
African-American activists